Saldus Municipality may refer to:

 Saldus Municipality (2009–2021)
 Saldus Municipality (2021–present)